Kanhai Ka Pura is a village in Bhind district and it comes under Surghan Gram Panchayat which comes under Mihona Tehsil and it comes under Lahar Vidhan Sabha. Which is an assembly constituency in Bhind district in the Indian state of Madhya Pradesh. As of 2011 India census, Kanhai Ka Pura has a population of over 530.

Geography 

Transportation 
Nearest Bus Stand - Under 10 km | Mihona, Lahar, Bhind

Nearest Railway Station - Under 50 km | Bhind, Gwalior, Etawah

Nearest Airport - Under 130 km | Gwalior, Jhanshi

References 

Villages in Bhind district